John Henry Weston House is a registered historic building in Cincinnati, Ohio, listed in the National Register on March 20, 2002.

Historic uses 
Single Dwelling
Multiple Dwelling

Notes 

National Register of Historic Places in Cincinnati
Houses in Cincinnati
Houses on the National Register of Historic Places in Ohio